Saint-Sauflieu is a commune in the Somme department in Hauts-de-France in northern France.

Geography
To the immediate west of the commune are the traces of the Chaussée Brunehaut, an ancient Roman road  joining Caesaromagus (Beauvais) with Samarobriva (Amiens). More traces of Gallo-Roman construction have been found to the north of the village, by aerial observation.

Population

See also
Communes of the Somme department

References

Communes of Somme (department)